The Fish Cabin at White Rock Shoals is a historic fish cabin near St. James City, Florida.

Description and history
The fish cabin is located at the south end of Pine Island in the Pine Island Sound. It was built before 1930 by the Punta Gorda Fish Co. The building was listed on the National Register of Historic Places in 1991 as part of a multiple property submission of fish cabins in Charlotte Harbor.

See also
 Commercial fishing – Recreational fishing
 Historic preservation
 List of historic Fish Cabins of Charlotte Harbor, Florida
 National Register of Historic Places in Lee County, Florida

References

Further reading

External links
 
 

Commercial buildings on the National Register of Historic Places in Florida
Buildings and structures in Lee County, Florida
National Register of Historic Places in Lee County, Florida
Pine Island (Lee County, Florida)